Eric Shannon (born April 4, 1991 in Woodland Hills, California) is an American soccer player.

Career

College & youth
Shannon played four years of college soccer at CSU Bakersfield from 2009 to 2012. While at college, Shannon appeared for USL PDL club's Des Moines Menace and Ventura County Fusion, the latter of which he also continued with in 2013.

Professional
Shannon signed his first professional deal with Guatemalan First Division club Antigua GFC on July 2, 2013. He later signed with USL Pro club Charleston Battery for their 2014 season.

References

External links
 Roadrunners profile

1991 births
Living people
American soccer players
American expatriate soccer players
Cal State Bakersfield Roadrunners men's soccer players
Des Moines Menace players
Ventura County Fusion players
Antigua GFC players
Charleston Battery players
Soccer players from California
Expatriate footballers in Guatemala
USL League Two players
USL Championship players
Association football goalkeepers
People from Valencia, Santa Clarita, California
People from Woodland Hills, Los Angeles